Algie, the Miner is a 1912 American silent Western film produced by Solax Studios. It was directed by Harry Schenck, Edward Warren, and Alice Guy and stars Billy Quirk, with Clarice Jackson as Miss Lyons. The film was advertised as: "A real live western comedy, showing how a sissy boy won his sweetheart's hands by going out west and making a man of himself".

During the early days of motion pictures one-reel films, approximately ten-minutes long, were made to be shown as part of a variety show, either in vaudeville theaters, along with live acts featuring singers or comedians, or at a nickelodeon movie theater where the audience paid five cents to view a half-hour of short films. Algie the Miner was shown at both types of theaters.

Plot
During a wealthy family's party, Algie informs Mr Lyons that he wishes to marry the man's daughter. Lyons writes out a letter that reads: "February 1st, 1912 / If Algie Allmore, proves himself a man, inside one year, he can have my daughter's hand in marriage. / Signed Harry Lyons".

Algie takes the letter, goes home, packs a small suitcase, tucks a tiny pistol into his waistband, and travels by train to the west. When he arrives two cowboys laugh at Algie and his "sissy" ways, and introduces him to the toughest cowboy of them all. A title card reads: "Algie's education is confided to Big Jim". Big Jim, a heavy drinker, shares his cabin with the newcomer, and frightens Algie by giving him a full-sized pistol. He teaches Algie how to ride a horse.

The next title card reads: "The Demon Drink, Algie begins to fill his contract". Two cowboys bring staggering-drunk Jim home, and the man appears to be hallucinating. Algie gets his friend onto his bunk, and shows great concern for the man's condition.

Later Big Jim and Algie begin digging into a hillside with pickaxes. Gold is discovered, Algie is given a second pistol, and he leaves the scene. Two outlaws attack Big Jim, and as he struggles with the men Algie returns, with both pistols aimed at the criminals.

Algie and Big Jim go into a bar, but Algie doesn't let his friend drink liquor. He scolds the cowboys who are trying to get Jim to drink, and the two leave together.

A year goes by and a title cards reads: "Come Jim and see me claim my girl". Algie shows Jim a calendar while explaining his story, and the cowboy shows happiness over the news.

The final title card reads: "Back East a Western way of ringing a door bell". Algie and Big Jim travel to the east, and Big Jim fires his pistol on the Lyons' porch, frightening everyone inside. The pair barge into the house, Algie shows Mr Lyons the letter he'd been given and demands his sweetheart's hand in marriage. Mr Lyons is reluctant to keep his promise to allow Algie to marry his daughter, but Big Jim draws his pistol from his holster, and Mr Lyons stops protesting.

Cast
 Billy Quirk – Algie Allmore
 Clarice Jackson – Miss Lyons
 Mary Foy – Society Dowager

Legacy
While most early short films were only circulated to theaters for a few months Algie the Miner was advertised as being shown in theaters more than two years after its release. In recent years the film has been shown as an early example of a gay character.

References

External links
 
 
 
 Algie the Miner on YouTube

1912 films
1912 Western (genre) films
1912 comedy films
1912 short films
1910s LGBT-related films
1910s English-language films
American LGBT-related short films
American silent short films
American black-and-white films
American comedy short films
Silent American Western (genre) comedy films
1910s Western (genre) comedy films
1910s American films